Young Man may refer to:

Boy or young adult man

Music 
Young Man (Billy Dean album) or the title song, 1990
Young Man, an album by Jack Ingram, 2004
"Young Man", a song by the Chicks from Gaslighter, 2020
"Young Man", a song by Justin Timberlake from Man of the Woods, 2018
"Young Man", a song by Living Colour from The Chair in the Doorway, 2009

Other uses 
The Young Man a 1984 novel by Botho Strauß
Young Man of Arévalo (fl. 16th century), Spanish Morisco crypto-Muslim writer
Young Man Kang (born 1966), South Korean filmmaker
Young Man Lake, a lake in Montana, US
Young Man (film), a Russian film

See also 

Young Mans Butte, a mountain in North Dakota
Young adult (psychology)
Youngman, a Chinese manufacturer of buses and trucks
Youngman (MC), British MC
Youngman (surname)